This article contains information about the literary events and publications of 1959.

Events
January 31 – Sandu Tudor begins a 40-year sentence at Jilava prison for "conspiracy against social order" and "intense activity against the working class", as meted out by a Romanian communist tribunal. He will die in 1962 at Aiud prison, possibly from torture.
April 30 – Bertolt Brecht's Saint Joan of the Stockyards receives its stage première. It was originally performed on radio in 1932.
May 7 – Scientist and novelist C. P. Snow delivers in the Senate House, University of Cambridge a Rede Lecture on The Two Cultures, to do with a perceived breakdown of communication between the sciences and humanities. It is later published as The Two Cultures and the Scientific Revolution.
May 28 – The Mermaid Theatre opens in the City of London.
July 21 – D. H. Lawrence's Lady Chatterley's Lover is one of three books whose bans are overturned in court with assistance from the lawyer Charles Rembar in the United States, the others being Tropic of Cancer and Fanny Hill. The book, published in 1928, legally circulates in the U.S. after a 31-year obscenity ban.
July 29 – The U.K. Obscene Publications Act becomes law, coming into force on August 29. It requires a work to be seen as a whole, permitting a "public good" defence against a prosecution for obscenity, and making prosecutions for obscene libel difficult.
September – Anthony Burgess, teaching in Brunei, suffers a breakdown and is forced to return to the UK, where he becomes a full-time novelist.
October 29 – Astérix the Gaul makes a first appearance in the first regular issue of the comic magazine Pilote.
November 11 – In the United States, the short film Pull My Daisy is released, adapted from an unperformed play by Jack Kerouac, Beat Generation, and narrated by him. It stars poets Allen Ginsberg, Peter Orlovsky and Gregory Corso.
unknown dates
Aldous Huxley turns down a knighthood. 
Colin Dexter begins teaching at Corby Grammar School.
Frank Herbert begins researching Dune.
Frederik Pohl becomes an editor of the American science fiction magazine Galaxy.
Marcel Achard is elected to the Académie française.
Literature Wales is established as The Academi Gymreig.
The first butoh performance, Kinjiki by Tatsumi Hijikata, is played at a dance festival in Japan. It is based on the novel of that name (Forbidden Colors) by Yukio Mishima and explores the taboos of male homosexuality and pedophilia.

New books

Fiction
 Eric Ambler – Passage of Arms
Isaac Asimov – Nine Tomorrows
H.E. Bates – A Breath of French Air
Saul Bellow – Henderson the Rain King
 Derek Bickerton – Payroll
Robert Bloch – Psycho
Antoine Blondin – A Monkey in Winter (Un Singe en hiver)
Heinrich Böll – Billiards at Half-Past Nine (Billard um halb zehn)
Ray Bradbury – A Medicine for Melancholy
Jurij Brězan – Der Gymnasiast
 John Brophy – The Day They Robbed the Bank of England 
John Brunner
Echo in the Skull
The World Swappers
Algis Budrys – The Falling Torch
William S. Burroughs – Naked Lunch
Taylor Caldwell – Dear and Glorious Physician
John Dickson Carr – Scandal at High Chimneys: A Victorian Melodrama
Henry Cecil – Settled Out of Court
James Hadley Chase – The World in My Pocket
Agatha Christie – Cat Among the Pigeons
Ivy Compton-Burnett – A Heritage and Its History
Richard Condon – The Manchurian Candidate
Alexander Cordell – Rape of the Fair Country
Julio Cortázar – Las armas secretas (The Secret Weapons, short stories)
Richard Crichton – The Great Impostor
Cecil Day-Lewis – The Widow's Cruise
Allen Drury – Advise and Consent
Alfred Duggan – Children of the Wolf
Jane Duncan – My Friends the Miss Boyds (first in the My Friends series of 19 books)
Shusaku Endo (遠藤 周作) – Wonderful Fool (おバカさん)
William Faulkner –  The Mansion
Ian Fleming – Goldfinger
 Sarah Gainham – The Stone Roses
Paul Gallico – Mrs. 'Arris Goes to Paris
William Golding – Free Fall
Richard Gordon – Doctor and Son
Günter Grass – The Tin Drum (Die Blechtrommel)
 Walter Greenwood – Saturday Night at the Crown
Vasily Grossman – Life and Fate («Жизнь и судьба»; completed but unpublished until the 1980s)
Robert A. Heinlein
The Menace From Earth
Starship Troopers
The Unpleasant Profession of Jonathan Hoag
Dorothy Hewett – Bobbin Up
Hwang Sun-won – "Rain Shower" (소나기, Sonagi, short story)
Jabra Ibrahim Jabra – Tammūz fī al-Madīnah (Tammuz in the city)
 Michael Innes – Hare Sitting Up
Shirley Jackson – The Haunting of Hill House
Uwe Johnson – Mutmassungen über Jakob (Speculations about Jakob)
John Knowles – A Separate Peace
H. P. Lovecraft etc. – The Shuttered Room and Other Pieces
John Lymington – Night of the Big Heat
John D. MacDonald
Deadly Welcome
The Beach Girls
The Crossroads
Ross Macdonald – The Galton Case
Colin MacInnes – Absolute Beginners
Compton Mackenzie – The Lunatic Republic
Alistair MacLean
The Last Frontier
Night Without End
Naguib Mahfouz – Children of Gebelaawi (أولاد حارتنا)
Norman Mailer – Advertisements for Myself
Ngaio Marsh – Singing in the Shrouds
James A. Michener – Hawaii
Walter M. Miller Jr. - A Canticle for Leibowitz
Gladys Mitchell – The Man Who Grew Tomatoes
V.S. Naipaul – Miguel Street
Mervyn Peake – Titus Alone
David Piper (as Peter Towry) – Trial by Battle 
Raymond Queneau – Zazie in the Metro (Zazie dans le Métro)
Robert Randall (as Robert Silverberg and Randall Garrett) – The Dawning Light
Mordecai Richler – The Apprenticeship of Duddy Kravitz
Kate Roberts – Te yn y grug (short stories)
Philip Roth – Goodbye, Columbus
Robert Ruark – Poor No More
Nathalie Sarraute – Le Planétarium
André Schwarz-Bart – The Last of the Just (Le Dernier des justes)
Mary Shelley (died 1851) – Mathilda (novella, written 1819–20)
Alan Sillitoe – The Loneliness of the Long Distance Runner
Andrew Sinclair – The Breaking of Bumbo, My Friend Judas 
Aimée Sommerfelt – The Road to Agra (Veien til Agra)
Terry Southern – The Magic Christian
Howard Spring – All the Day Long
Rex Stout – Plot It Yourself
Valerie Taylor – The Girls in 3-B
John Updike – The Same Door
Kurt Vonnegut – The Sirens of Titan
Keith Waterhouse – Billy Liar
Sheila Watson – The Double Hook

Children and young people
Rev. W. Awdry – The Little Old Engine (Fourteenth in The Railway Series of 42 books by him and his son Christopher Awdry)
Bruce Carter – Four Wheel Drift
René Goscinny – Le petit Nicolas
Joseph Krumgold – Onion John
Spike Milligan – Silly Verse for Kids
Bill Peet
Hubert's Hair-Raising Adventure
Goliath II
Dr. Seuss – Happy Birthday to You!
Margery Sharp – The Rescuers (first in the eponymous series of nine novels)

Drama
Edward Albee
The Death of Bessie Smith (written)
The Zoo Story (premiered in German)
Jean Anouilh – Becket
John Arden – Serjeant Musgrave's Dance
Alan Ayckbourn (as Roland Allen) – The Square Cat
Samuel Beckett – Embers (first broadcast)
Bertolt Brecht (died 1956) – Saint Joan of the Stockyards (Die Heilige Johanna der Schlachthöfe, first stage performance)
Albert Camus – The Possessed (Les Possédés)
Beverley Cross – One More River
William Douglas Home – Aunt Edwina
Refik Erduran – Cengiz Han’ın Bisikleti (The Bicycle of Genghis Khan)
Jack Gelber – The Connection
Jean Genet – The Blacks: A Clown Show (Les Nègres, clownerie, first performed)
Lorraine Hansberry – A Raisin in the Sun
Eugène Ionesco – The Killer (Tueur sans gages)
Geoffrey Lumsden – Caught Napping
Harold Pinter – The Caretaker (first published)
Zofia Posmysz – Pasażerka z kabiny 45 (Passenger from Cabin 45, radio drama)
Jean-Paul Sartre – The Condemned of Altona (Les Séquestrés d'Altona, translated as Loser Wins)
N. F. Simpson – One Way Pendulum
Wole Soyinka – The Lion and the Jewel
Arnold Wesker
Roots
The Kitchen
Tennessee Williams – Sweet Bird of Youth
Egon Wolff – Parejas de trapo
Zhou Xinfang with Xu Siyan – Hai Rui Submits His Memorial (海瑞上疏, Hai Rui Shangshu)

Non-fiction
Kenneth Anger – Hollywood Babylon
L. Sprague de Camp – Engines
August Derleth
Arkham House: The First 20 Years
Some Notes on H. P. Lovecraft
Savitri Devi – Impeachment of Man
G. H. Dury – The Face of the Earth
C. S. Forester – Sink the Bismarck! (also as The Last Nine Days of the Bismarck)
Georges Friedmann – Signal d'une troisième voie?
Erving Goffman – The Presentation of Self in Everyday Life
Laurie Lee – Cider With Rosie
Miguel León-Portilla – Visión de los vencidos: Relaciones indígenas de la conquista
Garrett Mattingly – The Defeat of the Spanish Armada
Czesław Miłosz – Rodzinna Europa (Native Realm)
Iona and Peter Opie – The Lore and Language of Schoolchildren
James Pope-Hennessy – Queen Mary 1867–1953
Karl Popper – The Logic of Scientific Discovery
Cornelius Ryan – The Longest Day
William Strunk Jr. and E. B. White – The Elements of Style
Wilfred Thesiger – Arabian Sands
Barbara Wootton, Baroness Wootton of Abinger (with V. G. Seal and R. Chambers) – Social Science and Social Pathology

Births
January 8 – Ovidiu Pecican, Romanian writer and poet
January 9 – Rigoberta Menchú, Guatemalan writer and Nobel Peace Prize winner
January 20 – R. A. Salvatore, American science fiction and fantasy author
January 28 – Megan McDonald, American children's author
February 2 – Jari Tervo, Finnish author
March 11 – Dejan Stojanović, Serbian-American poet and essayist
March 15 – Ben Okri, Nigerian poet and novelist
March 18 – Frédéric-Yves Jeannet, French-born writer in French and Spanish
April 15 – Emma Thompson, English actress and screenwriter
April 30 – Alessandro Barbero, Italian historian, novelist and essayist
c. May 1 – Yasmina Reza, French novelist and dramatist
May 3 – Ben Elton, English comedian, novelist and screenwriter
May 13 – Zeruya Shalev, Israeli novelist
June 12 – Hilary McKay, English children's writer
June 13 – Maurice G. Dantec, French science fiction author
July 19 – Vigdis Hjorth, Norwegian novelist
August 6 – Deborah Levy, South African-born British writer
August 17 – Jonathan Franzen, American essayist and novelist
August 27 – Jeanette Winterson, English novelist
September 9 – Matti Rönkä, Finnish television journalist and novelist
September 29
Jon Fosse, Norwegian fiction writer, playwright and poet
Benjamin Sehene, Rwandan writer
October 1 – Brian P. Cleary, American humorist, author and poet
October 7 – Steven Erikson, Canadian novelist and fantasy author
October 31 – Neal Stephenson, American science fiction writer
November 1 – Susanna Clarke, English novelist
November 22 – Christoph Klimke, German writer
December 20 – Sandra Cisneros, Mexican-born American author
unknown dates
Moira Young, Canadian children's novelist

Deaths
January 3 – Edwin Muir, Scottish poet, novelist and translator (born 1887)
January 14 – G. D. H. Cole, English political theorist, economist and historian (born 1889)
January 29 – Pauline Smith, South African novelist (born 1882)
February 20 – Laurence Housman, English playwright and writer (born 1865)
February 22 – Percy F. Westerman, English children's author (born 1876)
February 23 – Luis Palés Matos, Puerto Rican poet (heart failure) (born 1898)
February 28 – Maxwell Anderson, American playwright and film writer (born 1888)
March 4 – W. W. Greg, English literary scholar (born 1875)
March 17 – Galaktion Tabidze (Galaktioni), Georgian poet (suicide, born 1892)
March 26 – Raymond Chandler, American crime writer (born 1888)
April 14 – Julien Josephson, American screenwriter (born 1881)
May 18 – Apsley Cherry-Garrard, English memoirist and explorer (born 1886)
May 20 – Alfred Schütz, Austrian philosopher and sociologist (born 1899)
June 1 – Sax Rohmer (Arthur Henry Ward), English novelist (born 1883)
June 23 – Boris Vian, French novelist (heart attack, born 1920)
June 30 – José Vasconcelos, Mexican poet and political writer (born 1882)
July 3 – Johan Bojer, Norwegian novelist (born 1872)
July 26 – Manuel Altolaguirre, Spanish poet, editor and publisher (car accident, born 1905)
August 8 – Emil František Burian, Czech poet, journalist and playwright (born 1904)
September 5 – Marta Rădulescu, Romanian novelist and poet (born 1912)
September 14 – Laxmi Prasad Devkota, Nepali poet, playwright, and novelist (born 1909)
September 18 – Benjamin Péret, French poet (born 1899)
October 12 – Arnolt Bronnen, Austrian playwright and director (born 1895)

Awards
Carnegie Medal for children's literature: Rosemary Sutcliff, The Lantern Bearers
Hugo Award for Best Novel: James Blish, A Case of Conscience
James Tait Black Memorial Prize for fiction: Morris West, The Devil's Advocate
James Tait Black Memorial Prize for biography: Christopher Hassall, Edward Marsh
Miles Franklin Award: Vance Palmer, The Big Fellow
Newbery Medal for children's literature: Elizabeth George Speare, The Witch of Blackbird Pond
Nobel Prize for literature: Salvatore Quasimodo
Premio Nadal: Ana María Matute, Primera memoria
Prix Goncourt: André Schwarz-Bart, Le dernier des Justes 
Pulitzer Prize for Drama: Archibald MacLeish, J. B.
Pulitzer Prize for Fiction: Robert Lewis Taylor, The Travels of Jaimie McPheeters
Pulitzer Prize for Poetry: Stanley Kunitz, Selected Poems 1928-1958
Queen's Gold Medal for Poetry: Francis Cornford

References

 
Years of the 20th century in literature